Eidinemacheilus is a genus of troglobitic fish in the family Nemacheilidae endemic to Iran and Iraqi Kurdistan.

Species
There are currently 2 recognized species in this genus:
 Eidinemacheilus proudlovei Freyhof, Abdullah, Ararat, Ibrahim & Geiger, 2016
 Eidinemacheilus smithi (Greenwood, 1976) (Zagroz blind loach)

References

Cave fish
Nemacheilidae
Fauna of Iran
Fauna of Iraq